Chippewas of Georgina Island First Nation 33A is a First Nations reserve near the shores of Lake Simcoe. It is one of three reserves of the Chippewas of Georgina Island First Nation. It is an enclave within Georgina, Ontario, surrounded by the unincorporated community of Virginia Beach. It is separated from the mainland portion of the Chippewas of Georgina Island First Nation reserve by Black River Road and the private properties along it.

References

External links
 Canada Lands Survey System

Ojibwe reserves in Ontario
Communities in the Regional Municipality of York